Dan Ponce (born December 7, 1976 in Illinois) is a Chicago television journalist for WGN-TV, radio talk show host on WLS-AM (890) and founder of the a cappella group Straight No Chaser.

Career and background
Ponce's TV career began in 2005 when he was hired at WILX-TV in Lansing, Michigan, as a reporter and weekend anchor. In 2006, Dan joined ABC-owned WLS-TV (channel 7) in Chicago as a general assignment reporter.

In 2009, after Straight No Chaser's album "Holiday Spirits" went to #1 on iTunes and Amazon, Ponce decided to leave ABC and join the group full-time. SNC went on to perform hundreds of concerts throughout the country and record three more albums on the Atlantic Records label. The group's televised concert series "Live in New York" (produced by WTTW) aired on PBS stations coast to coast. Ponce later came back to a TV career and was hired by WGN-TV {Channel 9}.

His father is Phil Ponce, a Chicago television journalist who hosts Chicago Tonight.

Ponce earned his master's degree from the Medill School of Journalism at Northwestern University and his bachelor's degree from Indiana University, where he founded Straight No Chaser. Dan grew up in Wilmette and currently lives in Chicago.

References

Living people
American television reporters and correspondents
Medill School of Journalism alumni
Indiana University alumni
American male journalists
1976 births